Ronald Frederick "Ron" Turner (11 June 1929 – 12 October 2007) was a renowned British water polo player and Olympian.

He was born in Notting Hill, London, England and died in Acton, London, England.

Ron Turner played for Penguin Swimming Club, a water polo club based in West London, and represented Great Britain in the 1948 Summer Olympics as a reserve, in London, the 1952 Summer Olympics, in Helsinki, Finland, and the 1956 Summer Olympics, in Melbourne, Australia. At the Melbourne Games, he was chosen as part of the 'best of the rest of the World' team that played against the Olympic Champions, Hungary.

Subsequently, Ron Turner was involved in the organisation of competitive British water polo. He remained an active swimmer and trained regularly in the Masters section of the West London Penguin Swimming and Water Polo Club, a descendant of The Penguins, until his death.

Ron Turner was killed in a road traffic accident in Acton, West London, while cycling. He was 80 years old. His funeral took place on 24 October 2007 at Mortlake Crematorium and was attended by more than 100 people.

References

External links
 Ron Turner's British Olympic Association profile

1929 births
2007 deaths
English male water polo players
Olympic water polo players of Great Britain
Water polo players at the 1952 Summer Olympics
Water polo players at the 1956 Summer Olympics